Horka, or harka, was a title used by the Magyar tribes in the 9th and 10th centuries. According to Byzantine Emperor Constantine Porphyrogenetos in De administrando imperio, the horka had judicial authority. However, in other sources, the term was applied to a military leader (such as Bulcsú, who led the Magyar forces at the Battle of Lechfeld). Certainly at some point in the 10th century, the roles of horka and gyula (the chief warlord) had become similar, with the horka having authority in Western Transdanubia and the gyula in Transylvania in the east. In later sources the word appears, only as a personal name.

The title is somewhat similar to word harki, which is used to describe soldier in Arabic.

References

Hungarian noble titles